The following is a list of notable deaths in February 1990.

Entries for each day are listed alphabetically by surname. A typical entry lists information in the following sequence:
 Name, age, country of citizenship at birth, subsequent country of citizenship (if applicable), reason for notability, cause of death (if known), and reference.

February 1990

1
Gianfranco Contini, 78, Italian academic and philologist.
Lauritz Falk, 80, Swedish-Norwegian actor.
Peter Racine Fricker, 69, English composer, throat cancer.
Hassan Ibrahim, 73, Egyptian Air Force officer.
Yeghishe Derderian of Jerusalem, 78, Israeli Armenian patriarch (since 1960), heart attack.
Jadwiga Wajs, 78, Polish Olympic discus thrower (1932, 1936).

2
Kathleen Hamilton, Duchess of Abercorn, 84, British Mistress of the Robes (since 1964).
Paul Ariste, 84, Soviet linguist.
Paul Arzens, 86, French industrial automotive designer.
Benedict Daswa, 43, South African educator, beaten to death.
Enrico De Pedis, 35, Italian gangster, homicide.
Joel Fluellen, 82, American actor, suicide by gunshot.
Mel Lewis, 60, American drummer, skin cancer.
Sigbjørn Bernhoft Osa, 79, Norwegian fiddler.
Hans Schumm, 93, German-American actor, heart failure.
Don Welsh, 78, English football player.

3
Erv Kantlehner, 97, American baseball player.
Willibald Kirbes, 87, Austrian football player.
Jane Novak, 94, American actress, stroke.
Pa Tepaeru Terito Ariki, 66, Cook Islander lyricist ("Te Atua Mou E").
Marcel Thévenet, 74, French weightlifter and Olympian.

4
Zé Beto, 29, Portuguese footballer, traffic collision.
Jean Galloway Bissell, 53, American judge, cancer.
Leonard J. Fick, 74, American academic, heart disease.
Maria Gambarelli, 89, Italian-American actress and dancer.
Berta Karlik, 86, Austrian physicist.
Archibald Ross Lewis, 75, American historian.
Kate Simon, 77, Polish-American writer.
Whipper Billy Watson, 72, Canadian wrestler and trainer.

5
W. W. Bartley III, 55, American philosopher, bladder cancer.
Edgar Herschler, 71, American politician, governor of Wyoming (1975–1987), cancer.
Père Marie-Benoît, 94, French humanitarian.
Joseph Mauclair, 83, French road bicycle racer from 1927 to 1938.
Joseph J. Nazzaro, 76, American Air Force general, cancer.
King Perry, 75, American musician.

6
Bin Akao, 91, Japanese politician, heart failure.
Jeannine Auboyer, 77, French museum curator.
Bernard Bernstein, 81, American economist, cardiac arrest.
John Merivale, 72, Canadian-British actor, kidney failure.
Jimmy Van Heusen, 77, American composer, complications from a stroke.

7
Thomas Clark, 83, American Olympic rower (1932).
Tony Fomison, 50, New Zealand artist.
Max Koecher, 66, German mathematician.
Alan Perlis, 67, American computer scientist, heart attack.
Alfredo M. Santos, 84, Filipino general.

8
Rhys Adrian, 61, British playwright and screenwriter.
Bernice Carey, 78-79, American mystery writer.
Cassius Marcellus Clay Sr., 77, American painter and musician, father of Muhammad Ali, heart attack.
George de Mestral, 82, Swiss electrical engineer and inventor of velcro.
Xu Deheng, 99, Chinese politician.
Katalin Karády, 79, Hungarian actress and singer.
Pete Kmetovic, 70, American football player.
Charles Maclean, Baron Maclean, 73, British hereditary peer.
Del Shannon, 55, American musician, suicide by gunshot.
Ernest William Titterton, 73, British nuclear physicist, pulmonary embolism.

9
James Fleming Gordon, 71, American judge.
Ilse Hollweg, 67, German opera singer.
Saroj Mukherjee, 79, Indian freedom fighter and politician.
John Poelker, 76, American politician.
Jan Wojnowski, 43, Polish weightlifter and Olympian.

10
Clara González, 88, Panamanian feminist, judge, and activist.
Knut Hansson, 78, Swedish footballer.
Luigi Musina, 75, Italian boxer.
John Arthur Pilcher, 77, British diplomat.
Bill Sherwood, 37, American musician and filmmaker, AIDS.
Tony Solaita, 43, American baseball player, shot.

11
Léopold Anoul, 67, Belgian football player.
Tom Brennan, 59, American basketball player.
Marie-Dominique Chenu, 95, French theologian.
Enrique Kistenmacher, 66, Argentine Olympic athlete (1948).
Colin Henderson Roberts, 80, British classical scholar.

12
Joseph Peter Michael Denning, 83, American Roman Catholic prelate.
Erling Enger, 90, Norwegian painter.
Harold McCusker, 50, Northern Irish politician, cancer.
Victor Pokrovsky, 92, Russian choir director, translator, and music arranger.
Nenad Radulović, 30, Yugoslav singer, testicular cancer.

13
Binyomin Beinush Finkel, 78-79, Soviet-Israeli rabbi.
Angela Gregory, 86, American sculptor.
Heinz Haber, 76, German physicist.
Manuel Rodriguez Lopez, 55, Galician poet and writer.
Ken Lynch, 79, American actor, viral illness.
Leon Stein, 77-78, American writer.

14
Armistead L. Boothe, 82, American politician.
Michel Drach, 59, French filmmaker.
Graeme Hole, 59, Australian cricketer, cancer.
Tony Holiday, 38, German singer, AIDS.
Slick Johnson, 41, American racing driver, racing collision.
Dick Martin, 62, American artist.
José Luis Panizo, 68, Spanish footballer.
John M. Robsion, Jr., 85, American politician, member of the U.S. House of Representatives (1953–1959).
Fritz Schulz-Reichel, 77, German pianist.
Jean Wallace, 66, American actress, gastrointestinal bleeding.
Luděk Čajka, 26, Czechoslovak ice hockey player, spinal cord injury.

15
Keyes Beech, 76, American journalist and Pulitzer Prize winner.
Henry Brandon, 77, German-American actor, heart attack.
George Daney, 43, American football player, carbon monoxide poisoning.
Dolores Faith, 48, American actress, suicide.
Ulf Johanson, 68, Swedish actor.
Frans Kellendonk, 39, Dutch novelist, AIDS.
Dorival Knippel, 72, Brazilian footballer.
Jack C. Massey, 85, American businessman, pneumonia.
Norman Parkinson, 76, English photographer.
Rudolf Schaad, 88, Russian-German film editor.

16
John Eastaugh, 69, British Anglican prelate.
Keith Haring, 31, American artist, AIDS.
Nurul Momen, 81, Bangladeshi playwright.
Luis Ortiz Monasterio, 83, Mexican sculptor.
József Moravetz, 79, Romanian football player.
Tadanari Okamoto, 58, Japanese animator.
Volodymyr Scherbytsky, 71, Soviet and Ukrainian politician, pneumonia.
Joshua Shelley, 70, American actor.
J. C. Trewin, 81, British journalist.

17
Robert Bernard, 76, German footballer.
Jean-Marc Boivin, 38, French mountaineer, extreme sports person, film maker, and author , BASE jumping accident.
Brendan Corish, 71, Irish politician.
Larry Cox, 42, American baseball player, heart attack.
Hap Day, 88, Canadian ice hockey player.
Dino Falconi, 87, Italian screenwriter and film director.
Erik Rhodes, 84, American actor, pneumonia.
Allen Rivkin, 86, American screenwriter.
Hans Speier, 85, German-American sociologist.

18
Günther Bornkamm, 84, German theologian.
Herman Carlson, 83, Swedish ice hockey player.
Margaret Craske, 97, British ballet dancer and choreographer.
Richard de Zoysa, 31, Sri Lankan journalist, human rights activist and actor, shot.
Joe Erskine, 56, Welsh boxer.
Tor Isedal, 65, Swedish actor.
Frank Ross, 85, American filmmaker, complications from brain surgery.

19
Edris Rice-Wray Carson, 86, American medical researcher.
Ernest Cole, 49, South African photographer, cancer.
Gabriel Katzka, 59, American theater, film and television producer, heart attack.
Francis Keppel, 73, American educator.
Laura Spencer-Churchill, Duchess of Marlborough, 74, British socialite.
Otto E. Neugebauer, 90, Austrian-American mathematician and science historian.
Janusz Paluszkiewicz, 77, Polish actor.
Michael Powell, 84, English filmmaker, cancer.
Abdul Matin Chowdhury, Shaikh-e-Fulbari, 74-75, Bangladeshi religious scholar.
Massey H. Shepherd, 76, American priest and scholar.
William White, 69, Scottish cricketer. field hockey player and Olympic silver medalist.

20
Sergio Camargo, 59, Brazilian sculptor and relief maker.
Cecil Garriott, 73, American baseball player.
Harry Klinefelter, 77, American physician.
Verdina Shlonsky, 85, Russian-Israeli musician.

21
Zohrabai Ambalewali, 71-72, Indian singer.
Johnny Borland, 64, New Zealand athletics official.
Juanita Larrauri, 79, Argentine singer and politician.
Isaac Jacob Schoenberg, 86, Romanian-American mathematician.
Vincent Teresa, 59–60, American mobster (Patriarca crime family), kidney failure.

22
Stephen W. Burns, 35, American actor, AIDS.
T. O. Honiball, 85, South African cartoonist.
Andrew Jarvis, 99, Greek-American politician and businessman.
Victor Lasky, 72, American writer.
Evald Seepere, 78, Soviet/Estonian boxer.

23
Amritlal, 73, Indian writer.
Arne Bang-Hansen, 78, Norwegian actor.
José Napoleón Duarte, 64, Salvadoran politician, president (1984–1989), stomach cancer.
James M. Gavin, 82, American general.
Stan Hough, 71, American film producer.
Haq Nawaz Jhangvi, 37-38, Pakistani cleric, murdered.
David Samoylov, 69, Russian poet.
Annelien Kappeyne van de Coppello, 53, Dutch politician, cancer.

24
Arthur Ayrault, 55, American Olympic rower (1956, 1960).
Tony Conigliaro, 45, American baseball player, kidney failure.
Malcolm Forbes, 70, American politician and publisher (Forbes), heart attack.
Lloyd Jordan, 89, American sports player and coach.
Jure Kaštelan, 70, Yugoslav poet.
Arch Nicholson, 48, Australian film director, amyotrophic lateral sclerosis.
Sandro Pertini, 93, Italian politician, president (1978–1985).
Johnnie Ray, 63, American singer ("Cry"), liver failure.
Gabriel Sempé, 88, French Olympic hurdler (1924, 1928).
Darryl Usher, 25, American football player, shot.

25
André de Korver, 74, Dutch racing cyclist.
Henry Fairlie, 66, British political journalist.
Estelle Peck Ishigo, 90, American artist and author.
Ingrid Larsen, 80, Danish chess player.

26
Lew Erber, 55, American gridiron football coach.
Julian Gascoigne, 86, British general.
Cornell Gunter, 53, American singer, shot.
Iphigene Ochs Sulzberger, 97, American heiress and publisher (The New York Times).
Margot Walle, 68, Norwegian Olympic skater (1948).

27
Les Ames, 84, English cricket player.
Johannes Draaijer, 26, Dutch racing driver, heart block, heart attack.
Vern Freiburger, 66, American baseball player.
Alberto Mario Giustolisi, 61, Italian chess player.
Nahum Norbert Glatzer, 86, Austrian-American historian and philosopher.
Josephine Johnson, 79, American novelist, pneumonia.
Nguyễn Phúc Bửu Lộc, 75, Vietnamese politician, prime minister (1954).
Alexandru Rosetti, 94, Romanian linguist, accident.

28
Erik Anderberg, 98, Swedish naval admiral.
Jack Conroy, 90, American leftist writer.
Mario Craveri, 87, Italian filmmaker.
Sylvia del Villard, 62, Puerto Rican actress and dancer.
Fabia Drake, 86, British actress.
Kornel Filipowicz, 76, Polish writer, lung cancer.
Russell Jacquet, 72, American trumpeter, heart attack.
Colin Milburn, 48, English cricketer, heart attack.
Wallace Reid Jr., 72, American actor, plane crash.
John O'Sullivan, 88, Irish politician.
Tuppy Owen-Smith, 81, South African cricket player.
David Prichard, 26, American guitarist, leukemia.
Greville Wynne, 70, British engineer and intelligence officer, esophageal cancer.

References 

1990-02
 02